Pellacalyx is a genus of trees in the family Rhizophoraceae. There are 7 or 8 species distributed in Southeast Asia and surrounding regions.

Species include:

 Pellacalyx saccardianus Scortech.
 Pellacalyx yunnanensis Hu

References

Rhizophoraceae
Malpighiales genera
Taxonomy articles created by Polbot